Thomas Jenkins Semmes (December 16, 1824 – June 23, 1899) was an American politician who served as a Confederate States Senator from Louisiana from 1862 to 1865.  He was once described as "the most distinguished statesman and brilliant lawyer of the south." He was the 9th president of the American Bar Association 1886-1887.

Biography
Thomas Jenkins Semmes was born in Georgetown, D.C., son of Raphael Semmes and Mary Matilda Jenkins Semmes, a mercantile family of English and French descent. He graduated from Georgetown College (later known as Georgetown University) in 1842 and received a law degree from Harvard in 1845. He practiced law in Washington, D.C., until 1850, when he moved to New Orleans. He became a leader of the Democratic Party and was soon elected a member of the Louisiana House of Representatives. He was a U.S. District Attorney in New Orleans under U.S. President James Buchanan, and later Louisiana Attorney General. 

He became a strong advocate of secession. He served in the Confederate Senate from 1862 to 1865. He was a strong supporter and advocate of Louisiana troops, including the famed Louisiana Tigers, in which his brother Andrew served as a regimental surgeon. 

Semmes was a close adviser to Confederate President Jefferson Davis and during the war resided in Richmond less than a block away from the White House of the Confederacy. Semmes was credited with creating the motto for the Confederacy, "Deo vindice," which appears on the seal. Senator Semmes, in proposing this motto, took pains to stress that the Confederacy had "deviated in the most emphatic manner from the spirit that presided over the construction of the Constitution of the United States, which is silent on the subject of the Deity", and he clearly expected this invocation to bring his side victory. 

Semmes' home in Federal-occupied New Orleans was commandeered by order of Maj. Gen. Benjamin Butler to quarter Union troops.

He later served as a member of the Louisiana Constitutional Conventions of 1879 and 1898. He served as the President of the American Bar 1886 -1887, returned to New Orleans to practice law. He became a professor of law at the University of Louisiana, which became Tulane University. Semmes was President of The Boston Club 1883-1892.

Personal life
Semmes was married on January 8, 1850, in Montgomery, Alabama, to Myra Eulalia Knox and they had seven children. He continued to live in New Orleans and maintained a summer home in Warrenton, Virginia, which was built in 1873 located at 191 Culpeper Street.  The home is known as "The Louisiana House." 

In 1900 a public school in New Orleans located at 1008 Jourdan Street was named for him. The building was sold to a non-profit and suffered significant damage in Katrina. It continues to suffer from demolition by neglect.

He died in New Orleans in 1899 and is interred in Metairie Cemetery.

Family
A first cousin was Raphael Semmes, captain of the CSS Alabama and later admiral. Raphael Semmes, son of Richard Thompson Semmes and Catherine Middleton Semmes, grew up with his cousin in Georgetown after Raphael’s parents died. 

Thomas Jenkins Semmes' sister, Cora Matilda Semmes Ives, was an American writer known for her pro-Confederate utopian novel The Princess of the Moon: A Confederate Fairy Story, published in 1869.

References

|-

1824 births
1899 deaths
19th-century American politicians
Confederate States of America senators
Louisiana Attorneys General
Members of the Louisiana House of Representatives
People from Georgetown (Washington, D.C.)
People of Louisiana in the American Civil War
People of Washington, D.C., in the American Civil War
Harvard Law School alumni
United States Attorneys for the Eastern District of Louisiana
Georgetown University alumni
American Roman Catholics
Southern Historical Society